Khalid Tighazouine (born 18 June 1977) is a Moroccan middle distance runner who specializes in the 800 metres.

His personal best time over the distance is 1:45.27 minutes, achieved in September 2001 in Beijing.

In July 2004 Tighazouine tested positive for the drug nandrolone, and received a suspension from the IAAF which lasted until July 2006.

Achievements

References

External links

1977 births
Living people
Moroccan male middle-distance runners
Athletes (track and field) at the 2000 Summer Olympics
Olympic athletes of Morocco
Moroccan sportspeople in doping cases
Doping cases in athletics
Universiade medalists in athletics (track and field)
Mediterranean Games silver medalists for Morocco
Mediterranean Games medalists in athletics
Athletes (track and field) at the 2001 Mediterranean Games
Universiade gold medalists for Morocco
Medalists at the 2001 Summer Universiade
20th-century Moroccan people
21st-century Moroccan people